Pascal Chanteur (born 9 February 1968 in Saint-Denis) is a French former road bicycle racer. Chanteur was professional between 1991 and 2001.

His name was on the list of doping tests published by the French Senate on 24 July 2013 that were collected during the 1998 Tour de France and found suspicious for EPO when retested in 2004.

Major results

1990
 Tour du Hainaut
 General classification
 1 stage
 Tour de la Somme
1997
 Bordeaux-Cauderan
 Paris–Nice, 1 stage
1998
 GP de la Ville de Rennes
 Trofeo Laigueglia
 Volta a la Comunitat Valenciana
1999
 La Côte Picarde
2001
 Vergt criterium

References

External links

French male cyclists
1968 births
Living people
Sportspeople from Saint-Denis, Seine-Saint-Denis
Cyclists from Île-de-France